The 2014 Bloomington Edge season was the team's ninth overall, third as the Bloomington Edge and second as a member of the Champions Professional Indoor Football League (CPIFL). One of nine teams in the CPIFL for the 2014 season, the Edge finished the regular season with a 5-7 record, failing to qualify for the postseason.

Schedule
Key:

Regular season

Roster

References

Bloomington Edge
Bloomington Edge
Bloomington Edge seasons